Ceccaroni is a surname. Notable people with the surname include:

 Massimo Ceccaroni (born 1968), Swiss-Italian football player and trainer
 Stefano Ceccaroni (born 1961), Swiss-Italian football player and trainer, brother of Massimo

See also
 Ceccarini